Angelo Zimmerman (born 19 March 1984 in Willemstad, Curaçao, in the former Netherlands Antilles) is a footballer who currently plays for ONS Sneek in the Dutch Topklasse. He formerly played for Cambuur Leeuwarden, FC Emmen, BV Veendam and RBC Roosendaal.

External links

 Profile at VI

1984 births
Living people
Dutch Antillean footballers
Netherlands Antilles international footballers
Curaçao footballers
Curaçao expatriate footballers
Curaçao international footballers
SC Cambuur players
FC Emmen players
SC Veendam players
Eerste Divisie players
Derde Divisie players
Association football midfielders
People from Willemstad
WKE players
ONS Sneek players